Montescheno is a comune (municipality) in the Province of Verbano-Cusio-Ossola in the Italian region Piedmont, located about  northeast of Turin and about  northwest of Verbania.

The municipality of Montescheno contains the frazioni (subdivisions, mainly villages and hamlets) Barboniga, Cad Mater, Cat Pera, Cresti, Croppo, Ovesco, Progno, Sasso, Selve, Valeggia, Vallemiola, and Zonca.

Montescheno borders the following municipalities: Antrona Schieranco, Bognanco, Borgomezzavalle, Domodossola, Villadossola.

Demographic evolution

References

Cities and towns in Piedmont